Calvin Louis Chapman (December 20, 1910 – April 1, 1983) was an infielder and outfielder in Major League Baseball. He played for the Cincinnati Reds.

References

External links

1910 births
1983 deaths
Major League Baseball infielders
Major League Baseball outfielders
Cincinnati Reds players
Minor league baseball managers
Baseball players from Mississippi
People from Panola County, Mississippi
Nashville Vols players